Caroline Wyatt (born 1967) is an Australian-born English journalist. She has worked as a BBC News journalist for over 25 years, as defence correspondent until August 2014, when she replaced Robert Pigott as religious affairs correspondent until June 2016,  when she revealed that she had been diagnosed with multiple sclerosis.

Early life
Born in Darlinghurst, a suburb of Sydney, to an Anglo-Irish father and a Polish mother, Wyatt was adopted by a British diplomat, and his Swiss-born wife. She has two brothers.

Wyatt was educated at the independent Convent of the Sacred Heart School in Woldingham, Surrey, and then studied English and German at Southampton University, which also included six months of study at Rutgers, the State University of New Jersey at the New Brunswick, New Jersey campus in the US. After graduating from Southampton, she studied for a post-graduate diploma in print journalism at City University, London.

Career
Wyatt joined the BBC in 1991 as a news and current affairs trainee. She undertook work for Newsroom South East and the local station in Birmingham.

On completion of her training, she was based in Germany between 1993 and 2000, first as the business reporter, then Berlin correspondent in the reunified German capital at the time of the withdrawal of both Russian and British occupation armies from divided Berlin and the 50th Anniversary of the liberation of the Auschwitz concentration camp, where she found out that her grandfather had been held prisoner during World War II. Wyatt then became the Bonn correspondent on the Rhine River (in the former capital of West Germany). She was then the BBC's Moscow correspondent in Russia until 2003, when she became the network's main reporter in Paris, France.

In October 2007, Wyatt became the BBC defence correspondent.

War reporting
Wyatt reported from Baghdad during the December 1998, American bombing campaign of Iraq. She later covered the 1999 Kosovo conflict in the Balkans peninsula of south eastern Europe, from both Kosovo and neighboring Albania.
Following the September 11 attacks on the United States in 2001, she reported on the U.S. Invasion of Afghanistan during 2001–2002, from the military headquarters of the Afghan Northern Alliance. She also covered the later invasion and subsequent Iraq War (Second Persian Gulf War) in the spring of 2003 as an "embedded journalist" with the British Army troops in and around Basra. In 2003 she also reported from Paris.

Wyatt chaired the selection jury of the 2008 "Bayeux-Calvados Awards" for war correspondents.

Radio presenting
Wyatt has presented for BBC Radio on the Radio 4 network programmes The World Tonight, From Our Own Correspondent and the Saturday edition of PM, as well as "Europe Today, Newshour and Outlook on the BBC World Service. She has also co-presented Euronews on the BBC Radio 5 Live network.

Personal life
In June 2016, it was announced that Wyatt had been diagnosed with multiple sclerosis. She would remain with the BBC, but in a studio-based role within radio. In January 2017, Wyatt travelled to Mexico for experimental treatment of her illness, involving a stem-cell transplant.

References

External links
 

1967 births
Living people
Journalists from Sydney
Australian adoptees
English adoptees
People educated at Woldingham School
Alumni of the University of Southampton
Rutgers University alumni
Alumni of City, University of London
BBC newsreaders and journalists
BBC World Service presenters
People with multiple sclerosis
Australian emigrants to England
Australian people of English descent
Australian people of Irish descent
Australian people of Polish descent
English people of Irish descent
English people of Polish descent
English television journalists
English women journalists
British women television journalists
Australian radio presenters
Australian women radio presenters
Australian expatriates in England